The Women's Allam British Open 2012 is the women's edition of the 2012 British Open Squash Championships, which is a WSA World Series event Platinum (Prize money: $95 000). The event took place at the O2 in London in England from 15–20 May. Nicol David won her fourth British Open trophy, beating Nour El Sherbini in the final.

Prize money and ranking points
For 2012, the prize purse was $95,000. The prize money and points breakdown is as follows:

Seeds

Draw and results

Source:

See also
WSA World Series
2012 Women's World Open Squash Championship
2012 Men's British Open

References

External links
WISPA British Open 2012 website
British Open 2012 official website

Women's British Open Squash Championships
Women's British Open
Women's British Open
Women's British Open Squash Championship
Squash competitions in London
2012 in women's squash